"Warwick Avenue" is a song by Welsh singer Duffy from her debut album Rockferry (2008). The title refers to Warwick Avenue tube station in London. It was written by Jimmy Hogarth, Eg White, and Duffy and produced by Hogarth. It was released in May 2008 as the third single (second in North America) from the album, but had already charted by March and April due to download sales. It peaked at number three on the UK Singles Chart due to strong download and physical sales and has sold 249,165 copies in the UK to date. The B-side to the 7" single is "Loving You", and was written by Duffy, Richard J. Parfitt of the 60ft Dolls and Owen Powell of Catatonia.

This song was number forty-one on Rolling Stones list of the 100 Best Songs of 2008.

Single promotion, performances and cultural use

The song has been used as background music to several British soap operas. It was used at the end of an episode of Hollyoaks which aired on 10 October 2008, and was used in the 11 March 2009 episode of Waterloo Road. It also appears in the Activision game Band Hero and was performed by Jenny Douglas on Over the Rainbow.

Duffy performed the song at the 2009 Brit Awards, where she won the awards for Breakthrough Artist, MasterCard British Album, and Best British Female, the most awards for a female artist in one night.

Music details
The song is played in the key of Bb Major at a tempo of 84bpm. The vocal range is G3-D5.

Critical reception

The song received mostly positive reviews from critics. Digital Spy called it "cooler than a polar bear's freezer", "probably the finest cut from her debut LP", and "a classy affair", whilst also awarding the song four stars out of five.

Awards and recognition

Chart performance
"Warwick Avenue" entered the UK Singles Chart at number eighty-three, more than two months before its release (because of digital downloads from Duffy's Rockferry release). It then began a gradual chart climb, before peaking at number three, and spending six weeks in the top ten. During its first chart run it managed to spend a very successful number thirty-two weeks on the chart, last seen at number ninety-eight. Due to her ongoing success and the popularity of the song, "Warwick Avenue" re-entered the UK Singles Chart at number seventy-five, before rising to number seventy-four and falling to number eighty-seven the following week. This brought its total chart run in the United Kingdom to 35 weeks. On 28 December 2008, the UK Singles Chart landed this at number thirty-one for the year-end chart.

Music video
The music video for "Warwick Avenue" premiered on 23 April 2008, on Channel 4 and was directed by Daniel Wolfe. The video is almost entirely composed of a single shot; it starts with Duffy leaving Warwick Avenue tube station in the back of a black taxi, crying as she is singing the song. The video finishes with Duffy still in the car, wiping her tears, which had ruined her make-up. The taxi scene was only meant to be one scene from the whole video but the director felt that it was best to use this scene only when Duffy cried real tears. He continued to film it as the whole music video.

The video was later nominated for a MTV Video Music Award in 2008 in the Best UK Video category, but lost to "Shut Up and Let Me Go" by the Ting Tings.

Formats and track listings
UK CD single
"Warwick Avenue"
"Put It in Perspective"

UK 7" vinyl single
"Warwick Avenue"
"Loving You"

Australian digital download single
"Warwick Avenue"
"Put It in Perspective"
"Loving You"

German maxi single
"Warwick Avenue"
"Put It in Perspective"
"Loving You"
"Warwick Avenue Video"

iTunes B-side single
"Put It in Perspective"
"Loving You"

Charts

Weekly charts

Year-end charts

Certifications

Release history

References

2008 songs
2008 singles
Duffy (singer) songs
Songs about London
Songs written by Eg White
Songs written by Jimmy Hogarth
A&M Records singles
Mercury Records singles